The Rock Band series of music video games supports downloadable songs for the Xbox 360, PlayStation 3, and Wii versions through the consoles' respective online services. Users can download songs on a track-by-track basis, with many of the tracks also offered as part of a "song pack" or complete album at a discounted rate. These packs are available for the Wii only on Rock Band 3. Most downloadable songs are playable within every game mode, including the Band World Tour career mode. All downloadable songs released before October 26, 2010 are cross-compatible between Rock Band, Rock Band 2 and Rock Band 3, while those after only work with Rock Band 3.  Certain songs deemed "suitable for all ages" by Harmonix are also available for use in Lego Rock Band.

The Wii version of Rock Band does not support downloadable content, but Rock Band 2 and Rock Band 3 do, with DLC first made available in January 2009. Songs from the back catalogue of downloadable content were released for the Wii weekly in an effort by Harmonix to provide Wii players with every previously available song.

Following the release of Rock Band 4 for the PlayStation 4 and Xbox One, all previously purchased downloadable content for Rock Band 3 and earlier is forward compatible (with the exception of any downloadable content purchased for The Beatles: Rock Band) within the same system family at no additional cost.

32 downloadable Rock Band songs were released in 2007, 15 of which appeared alongside the launch of Rock Band on November 20, including song packs for Queens of the Stone Age, Metallica, and The Police.

List of songs released in 2007
The following songs have been released for the Rock Band games in the year 2007. All songs available in packs are also available as individual song downloads on the same date, unless otherwise noted. Dates listed are the initial release of songs on Xbox Live.

Some songs released before Rock Band 3 have been retrofitted to include Rock Band 3 features, including backing vocals, and the ability to buy an additional pack for Pro Guitar/Bass charts without having to buy the "RB3 Version" of the song.  Certain songs have been marked "family friendly" by Harmonix; such songs released before Rock Band 3s launch on October 26, 2010 can be played in Lego Rock Band. 

Starting October 26 (with The Doors), all new songs are only playable in Rock Band 3, due to a change in the file format. All songs released via downloadable content are playable in Rock Band 3, and support its new Pro Drum mode.  Most songs released for Rock Band 3 include core features for keyboards, Pro Keyboards, and backing vocals in the core song, where they are appropriate. Additionally, some of these songs features charts for Pro Guitar and Bass that can also be purchased.

{|class="wikitable sortable" border="1" style="font-size:90%; text-align:center; margin: 5px;"
|- 
!style="background:#dde;"|Song title
!style="background:#dde;"|Artist
!style="background:#dde;"|Year
!style="background:#dde;"|Genre
!style="background:#dde;"|Single / Pack name
!style="background:#dde;"|Release date
!style="background:#dde;"|Family Friendly
!style="background:#dde;"|Additional Rock Band 3 Features
|-
<onlyinclude>
|"Fortunate Son"
|Creedence Clearwater Revival
|1969
|Southern Rock
|
|Nov 20, 2007
|
|
|-
|"Juke Box Hero"
|Foreigner
|1981
|Classic Rock
|
|Nov 20, 2007
|
|
|-
|"Bang a Gong"
|T. Rex
|1971
|Glam
|
|Nov 20, 2007
|
|
|-
|"My Sharona"
|
|1979
|Pop-Rock
|
|Nov 20, 2007
|
|
|-
|"Cherry Bomb"
|
|1976
|Punk
|
|Nov 20, 2007
|
|
|-
|"Joker & the Thief"
|Wolfmother
|2005
|Rock
|
|Nov 20, 2007
|
|
|-
|"Ride the Lightning"
|Metallica
|1984
|Metal
|Metallica 01
|Nov 20, 2007
|
|
|-
|"Blackened"
|Metallica
|1988
|Metal
|Metallica 01
|Nov 20, 2007
|
|
|-
|""
|Metallica
|1988
|Metal
|Metallica 01
|Nov 20, 2007
|
|
|-
|"3's & 7's"
|Queens of the Stone Age
|2007
|Alternative
|Queens of the Stone Age 01
|Nov 20, 2007
|
|
|-
|"Little Sister"
|Queens of the Stone Age
|2005
|Alternative
|Queens of the Stone Age 01
|Nov 20, 2007
|
|
|-
|"Sick, Sick, Sick"
|Queens of the Stone Age
|2007
|Alternative
|Queens of the Stone Age 01
|Nov 20, 2007
|
|
|-
|"Can't Stand Losing You"
|
|1978
|Rock
|
|Nov 20, 2007
|
|
|-
|"Synchronicity II"
|
|1983
|Rock
|
|Nov 20, 2007
|
|
|-
|"Roxanne"
|
|1978
|Rock
|
|Nov 20, 2007
|
|
|-
|"Heroes"
|David Bowie
|1977
|Glam
|David Bowie 01
|Nov 27, 2007
|
|
|-
|"Moonage Daydream"
|David Bowie
|1972
|Glam
|David Bowie 01
|Nov 27, 2007
|
|
|-
|"Queen Bitch"
|David Bowie
|1971
|Glam
|David Bowie 01
|Nov 27, 2007
|
|
|-
|"N.I.B."
|Black Sabbath
|1970
|Metal
|Black Sabbath 01
|Dec 4, 2007
|
|
|-
|"Sweet Leaf"
|Black Sabbath
|1971
|Metal
|Black Sabbath 01
|Dec 4, 2007
|
|
|-
|"War Pigs"
|Black Sabbath
|1970
|Metal
|Black Sabbath 01
|Dec 4, 2007
|
|
|-
|"Ever Fallen in Love"
|Buzzcocks
|1978
|Punk
|Punk 01
|Dec 11, 2007
|
|
|-
|"I Fought the Law"
|
|1977
|Punk
|Punk 01
|Dec 11, 2007
|
|
|-
|"Rockaway Beach"
|Ramones
|1977
|Punk
|Punk 01
|Dec 11, 2007
|
|
|-
|"My Iron Lung"
|Radiohead
|1994
|Alternative
|
|Dec 18, 2007
|
|
|-
|"Brass in Pocket"
|
|1980
|New Wave
|
|Dec 18, 2007
|
|
|-
|"Buddy Holly"
|Weezer
|1994
|Alternative
|
|Dec 18, 2007
|
|
|-
|"Attack"|30 Seconds to Mars
|2005
|Emo
|
|Dec 25, 2007
|
|
|-
|"The Kill"
|30 Seconds to Mars
|2005
|Emo
|
|Dec 25, 2007
|
|
|-
|"Dirty Little Secret"
|All-American Rejects
|2005
|Emo
|
|Dec 25, 2007
|
|
|-
|"Move Along"
|All-American Rejects
|2005
|Emo
|
|Dec 25, 2007
|
|
|-
|"Song with a Mission"
|
|2006
|New Wave
|
|Dec 25, 2007
|
|
|-
</onlyinclude>
|}

References

External links
Official Rock Band series song list - Additional information for all songs featured in the Rock Band'' series.

Rock Band 2007
Downloadable 2007
2007 in video gaming